Canadian artist-run centres (ARC or ARCs) are galleries and art spaces developed by artists in Canada since the 1960s. Artist-run centre is the common term of use for artist-initiated and managed organizations in Canada. Most centres follow the not-for-profit arts organization model, do not charge admission fees, pay artists for their contributions (exhibitions, presentations, performances) are non-commercial and de-emphasize the selling of artwork.

Origins
The centres were created originally in response to a lack of opportunity to present contemporary work, especially in the 1960s and 1970s experimental art practices such as performance, installation, conceptual art and video in Canada and with the desire to network with other artists nationally and internationally. The early artist-run centres in Canada were critical of the commodification of traditional art forms exhibited in mainstream galleries and institutions which did not show emerging and experimental works, interdisciplinary practices or the works of marginalized artists. In the 1990s there were over 100 artist-run centres across Canada. Today there are at least 60 artist-run centres with continuous operating funding.

Similar artist-run organizations have been developed worldwide. In the US, they are commonly identified by the term artist-run space and in Australia by the term artist-run initiative (ARI).

Focus
Each artist-run centre has a unique program, but most present contemporary art by Canadian and international artists, often in combination with critical writing and other public events such as lectures, performances, screenings, etc. The centres have tended to focus on emerging artists and artists working outside the commercial gallery system. Some centres have been developed to support creative production, particularly in the areas of video, new media, photography and printmaking.

Support

Funding
The primary source of funding for artist-run centres is the Canada Council which has a specific program of two-year operating support for artist-run centres. Most centres also receive funding from the Provincial governments, most of which have an arts council to financially assist individual artists and arts organizations. Centres may also receive funding from their local municipal or city governments. Centres sometimes will secure funding for specific projects from corporations that manage lottery earnings or public and private foundations. Centres have tended not to pursue individual sponsors or patrons, neither corporations nor individuals, in part because they are in a critical relationship with the traditional and established art system of museums which have the resources to pursue that type of support.

Support for artists
Artist-run centres create opportunities for artists to present their work. Centres typically accept submissions openly and make selections by a peer jury process although some centres also use curators to select projects. Artist-run centres provide an alternative venue to the established art gallery system and also help the artist to install the work and will often facilitate the creation of a critical text published in conjunction with the exhibition. Centres will also promote the exhibition or presentation of new and experimental art works.

Canadian artist-run centres are committed to the principle of paying artists for the exhibition or presentation of their work. Indeed, centres are required to do so if they receive funding from the Canada Council. A recommended minimum fee schedule for payment is provided by Canadian Artists Representation (CARFAC), a non-profit artists' advocacy group founded in 1968 that serves as the national voice of Canada's professional visual artists. CAR first suggested fee schedules to Canadian galleries in 1968; by 1971 they came more widely into use as a result of a threatened boycott of galleries by CAR members, and in 1988 the payment of an Exhibition Right for the public exhibition of artistic production became part of Canadian federal copyright law with an amendment to the Canadian Copyright Act (R.S., 1985, c. C-42) recognizing artists as the primary producers of culture and giving artists legal entitlement to exhibition and other fees.

Advocacy
Artist-run centres advocate an artist-centric approach, promoting artists self-determination of what to present and how to present it. This approach has widely influenced the contemporary art scene.

The artist-run centres are collectively represented by associations formed by region or constituency, which associations are themselves represented by a national association. These associations advocate on behalf of their centre members on issues of public policy.

See also

 Artist-run space
 Artist-run initiative

Notes

Bibliography
 Bonin, Vincent, ed. "Documentary Protocols/Protocoles Documentaires (1967–1975)." Montreal: Galerie Leonard et Bina Ellen Gallery, 2010. 
 Bronson, AA, ed. "From Sea to Shining Sea: Chronology of Artist-Initiated Activities in Canada 1939–1987." Toronto: Power Plant, 1987. 
 Bronson, AA  "The Humiliation of the Bureaucrat: Artist-Run Centres as Museums by Artists." Museums by Artists. AA Bronson and Peggy Gale, eds. Art Metropole, Toronto 1983. pp. 29–37. 
 Khonsary, Jeff and Kristina Podesva, eds. Institutions by Artists: Volume One Vancouver: Fillip Editions and the Pacific Association of Artist Run Centres, 2012. 
 Wallace, Keith  "A Particular History of Artist-Run Centres in Vancouver." Vancouver Anthology 2nd Edition. Stan Douglas  ed. Or Gallery, Talon Books, Vancouver 2011. pp. 29–51. 
 O’Brian, Melanie, ed. "Vancouver Art & Economies." Vancouver: Arsenal Pulp Press and Artspeak, 2007. 
 Tuer, Dot. "Mining the Media Archive: Essays on Art, Technology, and Cultural Resistance." Toronto: YYZ Books, 2005. 
Robertson, Clive. "Policy matters: Administrations of art and culture." TORONTO: YYZ Books, 2006. 
Durand, Guy Sioui. "L'art comme alternative: réseaux et pratiques d'art parallèle au Québec 1976-1996." Québec: Éditions Intervention, 1997. 
Gilbert, Bastien et al. "Decentre: Concerning Artist-Run Culture / À propos de centres d'artistes." Toronto: YYZ, 2008.

External links
The Directory of Artist-Run Centres and Collectives
Artist-Run Centres and Collectives Conference / La Conférence des collectifs et des centres d'artistes autogérés (ARCA) (Canada)
The Pacific Association of Artist Run Centres (PAARC)
Atlantis: The Association of Artist-Run Centres from the Atlantic
Le Regroupement des centres d'artistes autogérés du Québec (RCAAQ)
Listing of artist-run centres world-wide
Canadian Artists' Representation / le Front des artistes canadiens
Artist Run Centres & Collectives of Ontario (ARCCO)
decentre - concerning artist-run culture | a propos de centres d'artistes
Manitoba Artist-Run Centres Coalition (MARCC)

 Artist-run initiative
Types of art museums and galleries